Aransas Pass is a city in Aransas, Nueces, and San Patricio Counties in the U.S. state of Texas. The population was 7,941 at the 2020 Census.

Geography

Aransas Pass is located at  (27.9019, –97.1395),F on the shore of Redfish Bay, a tidal water body between Corpus Christi Bay to the south and Aransas Bay to the north. The city limits of Aransas Pass encompass most of Redfish Bay and its islands, most of which are in Nueces County, as well a portion of Aransas Bay in Aransas County. The land portion of the city is primarily in San Patricio County, extending north into Aransas County. The city is on the mainland of Texas and is connected to Mustang Island (which contains the city of Port Aransas) by a -long causeway, and a free ferry that carries vehicles to the island.

Demographics

2020 census

As of the 2020 United States census, there were 7,941 people, 3,671 households, and 2,219 families residing in the city.

2000 census
As of the census of 2000, 8,138 people, 3,075 households, and 3,012 families resided in the city. The population density was 758.1 people per square mile (292.6/km2). The 3,493 housing units averaged 325.4 per mi2 (125.6/km2). The racial makeup of the city was 80.58% White, 3.44% African American, 0.76% Native American, 0.45% Asian, 0.01% Pacific Islander, 11.28% from other races, and 3.47% from two or more races. Hispanics of any race were 37.70% of the population.

Of the 2,961 households, 34.4% had children under the age of 18 living with them, 54.1% were married couples living together, 13.4% had a female householder with no husband present, and 27.7% were not families. About 23.1% of all households were made up of individuals, and 10.0% had someone living alone who was 65 years of age or older. The average household size was 2.70 and the average family size was 3.17.

In the city, the population was distributed as 28.4% under the age of 18, 9.4% from 18 to 24, 25.4% from 25 to 44, 22.3% from 45 to 64, and 14.5% who were 65 years of age or older. The median age was 36 years. For every 100 females, there were 97.5 males. For every 100 females age 18 and over, there were 95.0 males.

The median income for a household in the city was $27,376, and for a family was $33,227. Males had a median income of $29,383 versus $17,969 for females. The per capita income for the city was $12,964. About 18.3% of families and 19.6% of the population were below the poverty line, including 23.5% of those under age 18 and 10.9% of those age 65 or over.

The primary industries are shrimping and tourism, along with farming and oil and gas interests. The shrimp boat fleet sails from Conn Brown Harbor, a large, protected harbor chiefly dedicated to the shrimping industry. The area is popular for saltwater sports fishing and beach-going.

Area attractions

Aransas Pass is a destination for water sports, fishing, birding, kayaking, and hunting. The city is home to Conn Brown Harbor and the largest hummingbird garden in Texas. Events such as the Shrimporee, a three-day event, held in June, the Maybe Hot Maybe Not bike ride in November, and the Holiday Craft Show in December, as well as bay fishing on the Gulf Coast, keep visitors coming back to Aransas Pass.

Aquatic Park, a new addition to Community Park, features a competition-sized swimming pool with  1-m and  3-m diving boards. The lap pool is heated, with a body slide attached to it. A kiddie pool, with depths from 1–3 ft, features a bucket drop and a cannon slide.

Community Park is located on Johnson Avenue at S. Arch Street. Included at the park are lighted baseball fields, with dugouts, bleachers, electronic score boards, a concession stand, and public rest rooms. In the picnic area, 10 handicapped-accessible covered picnic tables are available. Each table is equipped with a small grill. One larger covered area on a concrete foundation is available for big groups. The playground features a merry-go-round, monkey bars, slides, rocking riding toys, a two-story wooden play structure, and digging toys. It is also handicapped-accessible. A paved walkway extends from the baseball field to an elevated gazebo overlooking the wetlands of the Aransas Pass Nature Trail. From there, handicapped-accessible walkways extend in two directions, ending around areas for bird and wildlife watching.

Conn Brown Harbor Park, spanning ,  has a boat ramp; it is located on Bigelow Street at the Intracoastal Waterway, Aransas Channel, and Conn Brown Harbor Turning Basin. It has two concrete boat ramps with docks, park benches, barbecue grills, shade structures with picnic tables, an open-air picnic table, two T-head fishing piers with lighting, a public rest room, and three cleaning tables.

San Patricio County Navigation District Marina, a  park, is located on Ransom Road. It is equipped with two double boat ramps and two covered boat shelters, an uncovered boat slip, and two boat trailer parking lots. This facility also has a recreational vehicle park with 36 spaces and hookups. It has two shelters with tables, running water, and lights. Wildlife viewing is available from three covered areas, with tables and barbecue grills, and a bait shop. Visitors can fish from a lighted fishing pier. The park has a separate children's playground with rock-riding toys and a jungle gym structure with a slide and climbing areas.

McCampbell Park, a city park, has a hard court surface with two basketball backboards and four picnic tables. No restroom facilities are available.

A hummingbird landscape is there to attract hummingbirds.

Notable people

 Emory Bellard, former University of Texas offensive coordinator and head coach at Texas A&M, inventor of the Wishbone formation
 Tommy Blake, former star defensive end at Texas Christian University
 Mickey Sullivan, former Baylor baseball coach

Education

Most of Aransas Pass is within the Aransas Pass Independent School District. Schools of that district include H. T. Faulk Early Childhood School (Pre-K–1), Kieberger Elementary School (2–3), Charlie Marshall Elementary School (4–5), A. C. Blunt Middle School (6–8), and Aransas Pass High School (9–12).

Some portions of Aransas Pass are in the Port Aransas Independent School District.

Climate

The climate in this area is characterized by hot, humid summers and generally mild to cool winters.  According to the Köppen climate classification system, Aransas Pass has a humid subtropical climate, Cfa on climate maps.

References

External links
 City of Aransas Pass official website
 Aransas Pass Chamber of Commerce
 

Cities in Texas
Cities in Aransas County, Texas
Cities in San Patricio County, Texas
Cities in Nueces County, Texas
Cities in the Corpus Christi metropolitan area
Populated coastal places in Texas